Hafter may refer to:
Hafter, the flat attachment of certain shrubs or lichens to a substrate
Karen Hafter (born 1954), Playboy centerfold for December 1976

See also
 Haftar
 Hafting